Fränk René Schleck (born 15 April 1980) is a Luxembourgish former professional road bicycle racer, who rode professionally between 2003 and 2016, for  and . Schleck is the older brother of Andy, winner of the 2010 Tour de France. Their father, Johny Schleck, was a professional road bicycle racer between 1965 and 1974, as was their grandfather, Gustave Schleck, who contested events in the 1930s.

Schleck's greatest achievements include five national road race championships, winning the Queen stage of the 2006 Tour de France, which finished on the Alpe d'Huez, the 2006 edition of the Amstel Gold Race classic, and an alpine stage of the 2009 Tour de France, finishing in the sole company of his brother Andy and Alberto Contador. On 30 January 2013, Schleck was suspended for 12 months following a positive test for xipamide at the 2012 Tour de France. The ban, backdated to the date of the positive test, expired on 13 July 2013.

Career
After riding for the Luxembourg military sports programme, he moved to Italy to ride for De Nardi–Pasta Montegrappa. He contacted Team CSC manager Bjarne Riis through their common youth coach Marcel Gilles of the ACC Contern amateur team. Schleck rode 2002 as a stagiaire on Team CSC and signed to a pro contract by Riis in 2003.

2005
Schleck's breakthrough came in 2005, with three podium places in the last month of the season. He finished all three races behind Paolo Bettini (2004 Olympic Road Race winner) and Gilberto Simoni (two times Giro d'Italia winner), losing Züri-Metzgete to Bettini, the Giro dell'Emilia to Simoni, and finishing third behind both in the Giro di Lombardia. Schleck ended 2005 ranked 13th on the 2005 ProTour riders list. He extended his contract with Riis and Team CSC until 2008, one of three riders in the team with a three-year contract.

2006

The 2006 season started with a fifth-place finish in Paris–Nice. After a crash in the Tour of the Basque Country, he suffered a concussion. He made his comeback in the Amstel Gold Race that month. Sitting with the favorites with ten kilometers to go, Schleck broke away alone up the Cauberg in Valkenburg for a solo finish while teammate Karsten Kroon disrupted the chase. Three days later he finished 4th in La Flèche Wallonne after a vigorous ride up the Mur de Huy where Spanish rider Alejandro Valverde proved unbeatable. Schleck's form continued days later with the Liège–Bastogne–Liège race, where he rode at the front for much of the latter half and finished 7th. In the Tour de France, he won stage 15 from Gap to Alpe d'Huez, where he broke away from Damiano Cunego 1.5 km from the finish.

2007
The 2007 season started with a 9th-place finish in Paris–Nice. In the Amstel Gold Race, he crashed with 47 km to go, eventually finishing 10th. His recovery continued at La Flèche Wallonne where he finished 7th, but the day before Liège–Bastogne–Liège, it was announced that he had a fractured vertebra. He rode despite the injury and launched the decisive attack a few kilometers from the finish with Danilo Di Luca. Di Luca attacked with one kilometer to go and Schleck faded to 3rd. Schleck won the fourth stage of the Tour de Suisse, taking the yellow jersey; he eventually finished 7th. He could only manage 17th at the Tour de France but was part of the successful attack in the world championship, finishing fourth.

2008

In the Amstel Gold Race Schleck finished 2nd, behind Damiano Cunego of Italy. In Liège–Bastogne–Liège Fränk and his talented younger brother Andy Schleck put on a show. Only two riders were able to follow the two brothers when they attacked on the final hills of the day: Alejandro Valverde and Davide Rebellin. Andy had to let the other three riders go and finished 4th; in the final sprint Fränk came 3rd. In the Tour de Suisse Schleck crashed during a dangerous descent and fell into a ravine. Miraculously, he was mostly uninjured. A week later, Schleck became national champion of Luxembourg for the second time in his career.

In the Tour de France he came 3rd in the first mountain stage. This took him to 2nd place in the overall classification, only one second behind the yellow jersey. Eight days later Schleck took the yellow jersey as leader of the general classification after claiming the single second he needed to pass Cadel Evans. He later lost the yellow jersey on Stage 17 to his own teammate, Carlos Sastre. At the end of the Tour he finished in 6th position overall.

2009

The 2009 cycling season started with the Tour of California, where Schleck managed to win stage eight. In March, Schleck placed second overall in Paris–Nice. On 19 April, while attempting to repeat his winning 2006 Amstel Gold Race effort, Schleck crashed badly together with Matthew Lloyd. He was taken to hospital with a concussion, but was released the same evening. Schleck made a rapid recovery, winning his home race, the Tour de Luxembourg, in June. No Luxembourgish rider had won the competition since 1983.

On 22 July he won the 17th stage of the Tour de France, reaching the finish line in the company of overall leader Alberto Contador and his own brother, Andy Schleck. He later finished 5th that year.

2010
In 2010, Schleck won Stage 3 in the Tour de Suisse and then he put in a surprise in the final time trial. He ended up winning the race. While riding in Stage 3 of the Tour de France, Schleck suffered a triple fracture of his clavicle, which was sustained on a cobble-stoned section of the stage, and was forced to retire from the race. He later then rode the Vuelta a España where he finished 5th.

They planned on forming a brand-new Luxembourg-based team, with former Team Saxo Bank director Kim Andersen. In October 2010, one of the managers of the Luxembourg cycling project revealed the team website, which was labeled Leopard True Racing, leading to speculation that the team might race under this name.

2011

At the Tour of France, on stage 12, Schleck attacked towards the end of the final climb finishing 3rd on Luz Ardiden. Schleck ended up 2nd overall after the Pyrenees with his brother Andy sitting in 4th. Schleck then finished 2nd on the Col du Galibier behind his brother Andy. However both lost time in the final time trial to Cadel Evans who went on to win the Tour that year. He finished the race in third place with his brother in second, marking the first time in Tour history that siblings had shared the podium.

2012–2013

Schleck started his season slowly as a member of the  team. He decided to ride the Giro d'Italia but withdrew on stage 15. Schleck then showed his form when he finished third in the Tour de Luxembourg and then finished second in the Tour de Suisse. He was then selected to ride the Tour de France. On the 6th stage of the race, Schleck crashed with about 25 km left, and lost just over 2 minutes, seriously hurting his chances of possibly winning the race.

Schleck left the Tour de France after the Union Cycliste Internationale (UCI) revealed he had tested positive for the banned substance diuretic xipamide.

On 4 July 2013  announced that they would not be renewing Schleck's contract, leaving him without a team. After Trek Bicycles purchased the World Tour licence of the  squad later in the month, it was announced that Schleck would be signed by the team for the 2014 season.

2014–2016 and retirement
In 2014, Schleck returned to the Tour de France, but did not ride as a contender; he finished in twelfth place.
In 2015, Schleck rode the Vuelta, and won a stage, his first grand tour stage win since 2009.

In 2016, Schleck fell in the Flèche Wallonne and broke his collarbone, which kept him out of contention for the Liège–Bastogne–Liège, but he came back in the Tour de France. At the end of the 2016 season, Schleck retired.

Doping allegations

2008
On 25 July 2008, one day prior to a decisive penultimate stage of the 2008 Tour de France, the German daily newspaper Süddeutsche Zeitung alleged contact between Schleck and the infamous Spanish doctor Eufemiano Fuentes in December 2005. Authorities however stated that they had obtained no evidence to support such a claim. The allegations in connection with Schleck followed a series of strong performances by the rider, who had worn the yellow jersey for several days. His father's car had also been subjected to a detailed search by French customs authorities during the Tour.

Prior to the 2008 UCI Road World Championships in Varese, Italy, on 26 September 2008, the same newspaper published another article on the connections between Schleck and Fuentes after claiming to have seen evidence on a bank transfer of €7,000 from Schleck to a Swiss bank account linked to Fuentes. Evidence was revealed by German police and subsequently confirmed by Luxembourgish prosecutors.

Following Schleck's public admission of such a payment on 3 October 2008, Bjarne Riis and  decided to suspend Schleck temporarily  from any further races until the outcome of the doping allegations towards Schleck had been fully clarified. Schleck was cleared of all allegations by the Luxembourgish antidoping authorities at the beginning of December.

2012
On 17 July 2012, Schleck was removed from the 2012 Tour de France by his team  during the second rest day after his A-sample returned traces of the diuretic Xipamide. Schleck's B-sample confirmed the positive result. Following the positive B-Sample the RadioShack–Nissan team suspended him.

In January 2013, it was announced that Schleck was handed a ban of one year by the Luxembourg Anti-Doping Agency, who specified that Schleck "had not ingested the substance intentionally" and as a result the standard two-year suspension was reduced to twelve months. The ban became effective from the point of the original positive, 14 July 2012.

Major results

1997
 1st  Road race, National Junior Road Championships
1998
 1st  Road race, National Junior Road Championships
2000
 National Road Championships
3rd Road race
3rd Time trial
 5th Overall Flèche du Sud
 9th Road race, UEC European Under-23 Road Championships
2001
 1st Road race, Games of the Small States of Europe
 1st  Road race, National Under-23 Road Championships
 7th Giro del Belvedere
2002
 National Under-23 Road Championships
1st  Road race
1st  Time trial
 4th La Côte Picarde
 7th Paris–Mantes-en-Yvelines
2003
 6th Milano–Torino
2004
 4th Cholet-Pays de Loire
 4th Gran Premio Città di Camaiore
 5th Grand Prix of Aargau Canton
 9th Overall Paris–Nice
 10th Road race, UCI Road World Championships
2005
 1st  Road race, National Road Championships
 2nd Overall Tour Méditerranéen
1st Stage 4 (TTT)
 2nd Züri-Metzgete
 2nd Giro dell'Emilia
 3rd Giro di Lombardia
 4th Overall Tour de Suisse
 7th Overall Paris–Nice
 8th Overall Étoile de Bessèges
2006
 1st Amstel Gold Race
 2nd Road race, National Road Championships
 3rd Overall 3-Länder-Tour
1st Mountains classification
 4th La Flèche Wallonne
 5th Overall Paris–Nice
 Vuelta a Mallorca
5th Trofeo Sóller
6th Trofeo Pollença
 6th Overall Tour de Suisse
 7th Liège–Bastogne–Liège
 7th Giro di Lombardia
 10th Overall Tour de France
1st Stage 15
2007
 1st Giro dell'Emilia
 2nd Coppa Sabatini
 3rd Road race, National Road Championships
 3rd Overall Volta a la Comunitat Valenciana
 3rd Liège–Bastogne–Liège
 4th Road race, UCI Road World Championships
 4th Overall Bayern Rundfahrt
 4th Overall 3-Länder-Tour
 7th Overall Tour de Suisse
1st Stage 4
 7th Overall Tour de Pologne
 7th La Flèche Wallonne
 8th Overall Paris–Nice
 8th Overall Tour of the Basque Country
 10th Overall Critérium International
 10th Amstel Gold Race
2008
 1st  Road race, National Road Championships
 1st Stage 1 (TTT) Tour de Pologne
 2nd Amstel Gold Race
 3rd Overall Tour de Luxembourg
 3rd Liège–Bastogne–Liège
 5th Overall Tour de France
Held  after Stages 15–16
 6th Overall Critérium International
 10th Overall Tour of the Basque Country
 10th Tour du Haut Var
2009
 1st  Overall Tour de Luxembourg
1st Stage 3
 1st Stage 8 Tour of California
 2nd Overall Paris–Nice
 3rd Road race, National Road Championships
 5th Overall Tour de France
1st Stage 17
2010
 National Road Championships
1st  Road race
2nd Time trial
 1st  Overall Tour de Suisse
1st Stage 3
 2nd Overall Tour de Luxembourg
1st Stage 2
 3rd Klasika Primavera
 4th Overall Vuelta a España
 7th Amstel Gold Race
 8th Liège–Bastogne–Liège
2011
 1st  Road race, National Road Championships
 1st  Overall Critérium International
1st Stage 1
 2nd Liège–Bastogne–Liège
 3rd Overall Tour de France
 6th Clásica de San Sebastián
 7th Overall Tour de Suisse
 7th La Flèche Wallonne
 10th UCI World Tour
2012
 2nd Overall Tour de Suisse
 3rd Road race, National Road Championships
 3rd Overall Tour de Luxembourg
 7th Overall Vuelta a Andalucía
2014
 1st  Road race, National Road Championships
 6th Overall Critérium International
 8th Grand Prix de Wallonie
 9th Overall Tour de Luxembourg
 9th Milano–Torino
2015
 1st Stage 16 Vuelta a España
 4th Overall Tour of Utah
 9th Trofeo Serra de Tramuntana
2016
 3rd Road race, National Road Championships

General classification results timeline

References

External links

 Trek profile
 
 

Cyclists at the 2004 Summer Olympics
Cyclists at the 2008 Summer Olympics
Cyclists at the 2016 Summer Olympics
Living people
Luxembourgian male cyclists
Luxembourgian Tour de France stage winners
Luxembourgian Vuelta a España stage winners
Olympic cyclists of Luxembourg
Sportspeople from Luxembourg City
Tour de Suisse stage winners
1980 births
Luxembourgian sportspeople in doping cases
Doping cases in cycling